The Bacoor City Strikers are a professional basketball team in the Maharlika Pilipinas Basketball League (MPBL).

Current roster

Depth chart

Head coaches

All-time roster

 Marlou Aquino
 Matthew Aquino
 Gab Banal
 Chris Sumalinog

Season-by-season records
Records from the 2022 MPBL season:

References

2018 establishments in the Philippines
Basketball teams established in 2018
Maharlika Pilipinas Basketball League teams